Donald Greco (born April 1, 1959 in St. Louis, Missouri) is a former American football offensive guard in the National Football League (NFL). Greco was selected in the third round by the Detroit Lions out of Western Illinois University in the 1981 NFL Draft. Greco was inducted into the Western Illinois University Hall of Fame in 2000. He was a two-time All-American, two-time team MVP, two-time All-Conference, and Conference Lineman of the Year. Greco was also nominated for the College Football Hall of Fame. He was the Head Coach for 14 seasons at Pattonville High School. During that time, he led the “Pirates” to 13 district titles, four Suburban North Titles, eight Sectional Titles and three appearances in the state semifinals. Three of his teams finished the regular season undefeated. Greco’s 2000 “Pirate” team made an appearance in the “Show Me Bowl”, but fell short of a state crown. During his 14 seasons, he established the longest tenure and the winningest record in the history of the Pattonville Program, (119-45). The St. Louis Post Dispatch, St. Louis “Rams” and the National Football Foundation have named Greco “Coach of the Year”. In 2001, he served as Defensive Coordinator for the River City Renegades of the Indoor Professional Football League. Greco has done work on local cable television as a color commentator for the, St. Louis “Believers” and “Rage” Indoor Football Teams. He is a member of the St. Louis Post Dispatch “All Millennium Team”, selected in December of 1999. In 2011, Greco was inducted into the St. Louis Football Coaches Hall of Fame. He is a published author. He has written two books detailing the history of high school football in the St. Louis area. He was also the head coach of the Pattonville High School in Maryland Heights, Missouri varsity football team's first run at the state championship in 2001.

References

External links
 

1959 births
Living people
American football offensive guards
Detroit Lions players
Western Illinois Leathernecks football players
High school football coaches in Missouri
Players of American football from St. Louis